The 2002 Copa Sudamericana was the inaugural Copa Sudamericana, a club association football tournament organized by CONMEBOL. It took place between August 28 and December 11. After the failure in creating a Pan-American Cup to be played among teams from the entire American continent, CONMEBOL decided to create another tournament bearing the continent's name. Nine association's clubs entered the first competition, with one not sending a representative; Brazilian clubs did not participate due to the late organization of the tournament and schedule conflicts.

The first match of the competition took place between Venezuelan sides Nacional Táchira and Monagas in San Cristóbal, Venezuela. During the match, Carlos Bravo became the first player to score a goal in the competition. Pierre Webó, a player from Cameroon playing for Nacional, became the first non-South American topscorer of any South American tournament. San Lorenzo, invited for being the winners of the 2001 Copa Mercosur, won the competition after thrashing Atlético Nacional 4–0 on aggregate and became the first winners of the Copa Sudamericana.

Qualified teams

First stage 

|}

Second stage

|-
!colspan="5"|Quarterfinalist 1

|-
!colspan="5"|Quarterfinalist 3

|-
!colspan="5"|Quarterfinalist 5

|-
!colspan="5"|Quarterfinalist 2

|-
!colspan="5"|Quarterfinalist 7

|-
!colspan="5"|Quarterfinalist 6

|-
!colspan="5"|Quarterfinalist 4

|-
!colspan="5"|Quarterfinalist 8

|}

Final stages
Teams from the Quarterfinals onwards will be seeded depending on which First Round tie they win (i.e. the winner of Match D1 will have the 1 seed).

Quarterfinals
Eight teams advanced to the quarterfinals from the first round. The first leg of the quarterfinals took place the week of October 1, with the second leg taking place the week of October 30. In each tie, the team with the higher seed will play at home in the second leg.

|}

Semifinals
The first leg of the semifinals took place the week of November 5, with the second leg taking place the week of November 13.

|}

Finals

In the finals, if the finalists are tied on points after the culmination of the second leg, the winner will be the team who scored the most goals. If they are tied on goals, the game will move onto a penalty shootout if necessary.

References

External links
Copa Sudamericana 2002 Archived URL

2
Copa Sudamericana seasons